Live at the Bijou is a 1977 live album by jazz saxophonist Grover Washington Jr. It was released via Kudu Records label.

Reception

 
Recorded live in May 1977 at the Bijou Cafe in Philadelphia, Pennsylvania. Released as a double album in late 1977, this album would chart number one on the Jazz albums chart and number four on the Soul album charts. From the album the single "Summer Song" / "Juffure" was released on March 1, 1978 and reached #57 in the R&B charts. This would be Grover's last album produced by Creed Taylor. A reviewer at Dusty Groove stated "A totally great Grover Washington record – and with 25 years behind us, we really now realize how fantastic all the early Kudu sessions really were! The record was recorded live at the Bijou, and is spread out over 2 long LPs, with lots of room for tasty open-ended solos by Grover and the group".

Track listing
"On The Cusp" (Richard Steacker) - 6:15 	
"You Make Me Dance" (Tyrone Brown) - 5:41 	
"Lock It in the Pocket" (Richard Steacker) - 6:50 	
"Days in Our Lives" (James Simmons) - 7:44 	
"Mr. Magic" (Ralph MacDonald, William Salter) - 12:24 	
"Summer Song" (John Blake) - 7:30 	
"Juffure" (Millard Vinson) - 9:30 	
"Sausalito" (James Simmons, John Blake Jr., Leonard "Doc" Gibbs Jr., Leslie Burrs, Richard Steacker, Tyrone Brown) - 9:51 	
"Funkfoot" (John Blake) - 8:31

Personnel 
 Grover Washington Jr. – alto saxophone, soprano saxophone, tenor saxophone 
 James "Sid" Simmons – keyboards
 Richard Lee Steacker – guitars 
 Tyrone Brown – bass
 Millard "Pete" Vinson – drums
 Leonard "Doc" Gibbs – percussion
 Leslie Burrs – flute
 John Blake Jr. – electric violin
 Alan Blake – vocals
 Lita Blake – vocals

Production 
 Creed Taylor – producer 
 Dale Ashby – recording 
 Dave Palmer – engineer 
 Joel Cohn – assistant engineer 
 Joe Gastwirt – mastering 
 Sib Chalawick – art direction, design 
 Bernie Block – photography 
 White Gate – photography

Studios
 Additional recording by Dale Ashby and Father Mobile Recording Truck (Basking Ridge, NJ).
 Mixed at Electric Lady Studios (New York, NY).
 Mastered at Masterdisk (New York, NY).

Charts

Singles

References

External links
 Grover Washington Jr. – Live At The Bijou at Discogs

1977 live albums
Grover Washington Jr. albums
Kudu Records albums
Albums produced by Creed Taylor